The Reserve Infantry Division of Hebei() was a reserve infantry formation of the People's Liberation Army active since 1983.

The division was activated in July 1983, in Chengde, Hebei as the 1st Reserve Division of Chengde(). The division was then composed of:
1st Regiment - Pingquan
2nd Regiment - Chengde County
3rd Regiment - Kuancheng
Artillery Regiment - Xinglong
Tank Regiment- Chengde

In January 1986 the division was redesignated as the Reserve Infantry Division of Chengde(). In March 1986, the Tank Regiment was disbanded.

In March 1999 the division was redesignated as the Reserve Infantry Division of Hebei(). The 2nd Regiment was disbanded and replaced by a new regiment activated in Hengshui. 

Since then the division was composed of:
1st Regiment
2nd Regiment - Hengshui
3rd Regiment - Neiqiu
Artillery Regiment

References

Reserve divisions of the People's Liberation Army
Military units and formations established in 1983